Torre Solaria is a skyscraper in Milan, Italy. The 37 story building is located near Torre Diamante, in the Garibaldi district.

See also
Skyscraper design and construction
List of tallest buildings in Italy

References

Skyscrapers in Milan
Residential buildings completed in 2013